Bufo linquensis is a prehistoric species of toad that lived in the Miocene of China. It is known from Shanwang, Shandong province.

References

linquensis
Miocene amphibians
Miocene animals of Asia
Prehistoric animals of China